The Liberal Party of Canada's Shadow Cabinet of the 41st Canadian Parliament was last shuffled on April 17, 2013 and selected by leader Justin Trudeau. The shadow cabinet was most recently shuffled on August 21, 2013.

Liberal Shadow Cabinet

Parliamentary leadership
Justin Trudeau - Leader, Youth
Ralph Goodale - Deputy Leader
Dominic LeBlanc - House Leader
Kevin Lamoureux - Deputy House Leader
Judy Foote - Whip
 Frank Valeriote - Deputy Whip and Veterans' Affairs
Francis Scarpaleggia - National Caucus Chair
Mauril Bélanger - Co-Operatives
Carolyn Bennett - Aboriginal Affairs
Scott Brison - Finance
Gerry Byrne - Treasury Board, Public Works and Government Services
Sean Casey - Justice
Irwin Cotler - Rights and Freedoms, International Justice
Rodger Cuzner - Employment and Social Development, Labour
Stéphane Dion - Canadian Heritage, Official Languages, Intergovernmental Affairs
Emmanuel Dubourg - National Revenue
Kirsty Duncan - Consular Affairs, International Development, Status of Women
Wayne Easter - Public Safety
Mark Eyking - Agriculture and Agri-Food
Chrystia Freeland - International Trade
Hedy Fry - Health
Marc Garneau - Foreign Affairs, Francophonie
Ted Hsu - Science and Technology, Post-Secondary Education, Federal Economic Development Agency for Southern Ontario and Federal Economic Development Initiative in Northern Ontario
Yvonne Jones - Canadian Northern Economic Development Agency and Northern Development, Arctic Council, Atlantic Canada Opportunities Agency, Search and Rescue
Lawrence MacAulay - Fisheries and Oceans
John McCallum - Citizenship and Immigration, Multiculturalism, Seniors
David McGuinty - Transport, Infrastructure and Communities
John McKay - Environment
Joyce Murray - National Defence, Western Economic Diversification
Geoff Regan - Natural Resources
Judy Sgro - Industry
Scott Simms - Democratic Reform and Citizen Services
Lise St-Denis - Early Learning and Childcare

See also
Cabinet of Canada
Shadow Cabinet
Bloc Québécois Shadow Cabinet

External links
Liberal Opposition Critics
The Opposition in the Canadian House of Commons: Role, Structure, and Powers | Mapleleafweb.com

41st Canadian Parliament
Liberal Party of Canada
Canadian shadow cabinets